The Mask may refer to:

Books and comics
 The Mask (comics), a comic book series by publisher Dark Horse Comics
 Mask (DC Comics), an opponent of Wonder Woman
 The Mask (novel), a 1981 novel written by Dean Koontz under the pseudonym Owen West
 The Mask (short story), a 1974 short story by Stanislaw Lem
 "The Mask", a short story by French author Guy de Maupassant
 Maska ("The Mask"), a novella by Stanisław Lem

Film and television
 The Mask (1919 film), a German silent crime film
 The Mask (1921 film), an American silent mystery film 
Punchinello, a 1926 American short silent film featuring Bela Lugosi, re-released in 1929 with added music and color under the title The Mask
 The Mask (1961 film), a low-budget Canadian horror film produced in 3-D and released by Warner Bros
 The Mask (1988 film), an Italian film
 The Mask (franchise), media franchise based on the comic book series
 The Mask (1994 film), a comedy starring Jim Carrey 
 Son of the Mask, sequel to the 1994 film
 The Mask: Animated Series, an animated television series
 K-20: Legend of the Mask, a 2008 Japanese action film written and directed by Shimako Satō and based on a novel by Sō Kitamura and its sequel
 "The Mask" (Courage the Cowardly Dog), an episode of Courage the Cowardly Dog
 "The Mask", Episode 27 of Mysticons that some consider to be the premiere of the third and final season of the 2017 Nickelodeon show
 "The Masks", a 1964 episode of the TV series The Twilight Zone

Music
 "The Mask", a song by Dangerdoom featuring Ghostface Killah from the album The Mouse and the Mask
 "The Mask", a song by Black Light Burns from their album Cruel Melody

Other
 Careto (malware) or The Mask, a piece of espionage malware discovered in 2014
 The Mask (video game), a Super NES side-scrolling action game (based on the 1994 film)

See also
 Mask (disambiguation)
 Behind the Mask (disambiguation)
 Onibaba (film) a 1964 Japanese historical drama and horror film inspired by the Shin Buddhist parable about yome-odoshi-no men (嫁おどしの面) (bride-scaring mask)

fr:Mask